Dhanyawaddy was the capital of the first Arakanese Kingdom, located in what is now Northern Rakhine State, Myanmar. The name is a corruption of the Pali word Dhannavati, which means "large area or rice cultivation or the rice bowl". Like many of its successors, the Kingdom of Dhanyawadi was based on trade between the East (pre-Pagan Myanmar, Pyu, China, the Mons), and the West (Indian subcontinent).

Like much of Northern Rakhine State, it is in a hilly locale. Much of it is now deserted, with the only signs of civilisation being the stalls around the Mahamuni and meditation centres, opened to cater to the influx of pilgrims to the Mahamuni shrine (not the Mahamuni Image).

The site can be reached by a one and a half to two hours bus ride from Mrauk U. Up until the mid-1950s, Dhanyawadi could also be reached by boat from the Thare Chaung, but pollution and silting has almost blocked the canal leading to the site. Remains of the city wall, and the palace compound are still visible. Beyond the walls, the remains of a wide moat, now silted over and covered by paddy fields, are still visible in places. The remains of brick fortifications can be seen along the hilly ridge which provided protection from the west. Aerial photographs indicate that Dhanyawadi's irrigation channels and storage tanks were centred at the palace site.

It was the most Indianized of the four Arakanese kingdoms to emerge. Although local legend and folklore claim that the Kingdom of Dhanyawadi existed before the time of the Buddha (before 6th century BCE), most archaeological evidence points to a period between the 4th and the 6th century CE or 1st century CE

The most prominent Buddhist site is the Mahamuni Shrine. According to local legend, the Buddha visited Dhanyawadi during his life. In Dhanyawadi, the noblemen and the affluent donated their wealth and possessions (mainly gold and silver), to be melted and cast into an image of the Buddha. The Buddha is said to have provided seven drops of his sweat, taken from his chest, and the drops were added to the molten metals. This allowed the Mahamuni Image, once cast, to be able to preach the Dhamma.

When Arakan fell to the Burmese in 1785, the Burmese tried to take away the statue back to Amarapura - then, their royal capital. But, here, Burmese and Arakanese sources diverge. The Arakanese claim that Buddha image disappeared - either from the temple, or when the Burmese tried to load it onto an awaiting barge at Thare Chaung. The Burmese, on the other hand, claim that they transported the Maha Muni back to their capital (which was then moved later to Mandalay). But some Burmese academics are now supporting the fact that the Maha Muni never left Rakhine State.

See also
Rakhine State 
Waithali
Mrauk U

References

The Land of the Great Image — Being Experiences of Friar Manrique in Arakan − by Maurice Collis.

Populated places in Rakhine State
Former countries in Burmese history
Archaeological sites in Myanmar
Bay of Bengal